Giuseppe "Beppe" Gabbiani (born 2 January 1957) is an Italian racing driver. He participated in 17 World Championship Formula One Grands Prix, debuting on 1 October 1978, and scored no championship points. He also participated in one non-Championship Formula One race.

In Formula 2, he won the 1983 Eifelrennen.

In sports car racing, he finished third in the 2003 1000km Spa.

Racing record

Complete European Formula Two Championship results
(key) (Races in bold indicate pole position; races in italics indicate fastest lap)

Complete Formula One World Championship results
(key)

Complete 24 Hours of Le Mans results

Complete International Formula 3000 results
(key) (Races in bold indicate pole position; races in italics indicate fastest lap.)

References
Profile at grandprix.com

External links
 

Italian racing drivers
Italian Formula One drivers
Surtees Formula One drivers
Osella Formula One drivers
European Formula Two Championship drivers
1957 births
Living people
International Formula 3000 drivers
24 Hours of Le Mans drivers
European Le Mans Series drivers
World Sportscar Championship drivers
FIA GT Championship drivers
DAMS drivers
Schnitzer Motorsport drivers